The best known valley Fossárdalur ("waterfall river valley") in Iceland runs from the direction of Þingvellir into the southern side of Hvalfjörður. 

Throughout the course of the name giving river Fossá ("waterfall river"), as the name says, there are many waterfalls, the most visited of which lies beside the Route 47. Car parking is provided next to the main road. 

There are some other rivers by the name of Fossá in Iceland, not far from it (Fossá (Kjós)), but also in other parts of the country, p.ex. in the Eastern Region (Austurland) near the fjord Berufjörður in East Iceland (Fossá (Berufjörður)).

References

Sources 
 FOSSA. BERUFJORDUR. Nordic adventure travel
 The beautiful waterfalls in Fossá river. By Regína Hrönn Ragnarsdóttir. Guide to Island
 Salmon & trout fishing area Jökla

Rivers of Iceland